Sergio Almiron is the name of three Argentine footballers:

 Sergio Omar Almirón (born 1958), 1986 World Champion
 Sergio Bernardo Almirón (born 1980), currently a coach for S.S. Akragas Città dei Templi
 Sergio Oscar Almirón (born 1985), currently playing for UTC